Van Praag is a surname of Dutch origin, meaning "from Prague". Notable people with the surname include:

 Bernard van Praag (born 1939), Dutch economist professor
 Henri van Praag (1916–1988), Dutch educator, philosopher, and theologian
 Herman van Praag (born 1929), Dutch psychiatrist
 Jaap van Praag (1910–1987), Dutch football administrator
 Jaap van Praag (1911–1981), Dutch humanist professor
 Lionel Van Praag (1908–1987), Australian motorcycle speedway champion
 Louis van Praag (1926–1993), British industrial designer
 Marga van Praag (born 1946), Dutch journalist
 Menna van Praag (born 1978), British author
 Michael van Praag (born 1947), Dutch football administrator
 Siegfried van Praag (1899–2002), Dutch author

References

Dutch-language surnames
Surnames of Dutch origin